Velcho Stoyanov (1907 – 1982), was a Bulgarian football player. He captained Slavia Sofia, which he led to the team's first national championship in 1928, and again in 1930. He played for the Bulgarian national side on 18 occasions and scored 5 goals. He was also part of Bulgaria's squad for the 1924 Summer Olympics, but he did not play in any matches.

References

1907 births
1982 deaths
Bulgarian footballers
Bulgaria international footballers
Association football forwards
PFC Slavia Sofia players